Berrook is a locality situated in remote north-west Victoria in the Sunraysia region.  The place by road, about 8 kilometres east from Peebinga South Australia and only about 3 kilometres from the South Australian Border. It can be found by following the Panitya- Berrook unsealed road north for 30 kilometres from Sunset. It is in the local government area of the Rural City of Mildura.

Berrook is near the south-west areas of the Murray-Sunset National Park.

Berrook Post Office opened on 18 February 1929 and closed in 1935.

References